The Golden Stallion is a 1949 American Western film directed by William Witney and starring Roy Rogers, Dale Evans and Estelita Rodriguez. The film was part of the long-running series of Roy Rogers films produced by Republic Pictures.

Plot
Diamond smugglers are using a herd of wild horses to smuggle diamonds into the USA from Mexico. The leader of the herd, the titular golden stallion, kills one of the diamond smugglers and Trigger is accused of the murder. Rather than let Trigger be destroyed, Rogers confesses to accidentally killing the man in a fight and is sentenced to several years in jail for manslaughter. A few years later, Rogers learns about the diamond smuggling and conspires with the local sheriff to capture the smugglers.

Main cast
 Roy Rogers as himself 
 Trigger (horse) as himself 
 Dale Evans as Stormy Billings  
 Estelita Rodriguez as Pepé Valdez  
 Pat Brady as Sparrow Biffle  
 Douglas Evans as Jeff Middleton, Owner of Oro City Hotel 
 Frank Fenton as Oro City Sheriff  
 Fiachra Maguire as Henchman Ben 
 Dale Van Sickel as Ed Hart  
 Clarence Straight as Bartender Spud  
 Jack Sparks as Guard  
 Chester Conklin as Old Man  
 Foy Willing as Foy

Production
Director William Witney remains a favorite of Quentin Tarantino, who has spoken eloquently in an extensive New York Times interview, among other venues, about Witney's prowess as a director, mentioning Witney's work with Roy Rogers programmers, detailing how Witney gradually moved Rogers into more naturalistic costumes such as jeans and flannel shirts, and how occasionally the camera would follow Rogers' horse Trigger for much of a film, going off and having adventures with other animals before returning to Rogers. Tarantino and reporter Rick Lyman screened The Golden Stallion together during the aforementioned interview, with Tarantino keeping up a running commentry about the production.

References

Bibliography
 Hurst, Richard M. Republic Studios: Beyond Poverty Row and the Majors. Scarecrow Press, 2007.

External links

1949 films
American Western (genre) films
1949 Western (genre) films
Films directed by William Witney
Films scored by Nathan Scott
Republic Pictures films
Trucolor films
1940s English-language films
1940s American films